Floris I (born c. 1017 in Vlaardingen – 28 June 1061) was count of Holland, then called Frisia west of the Vlie, from 1049 to 1061. 

Floris was born in Vlaardingen. He was a son of Dirk III and Othelindis of Nordmark. Floris succeeded his brother Dirk IV, who was murdered in 1049. He married  1050 Gertrude, daughter of Duke Bernard II of Saxony, and had at least three children with her: Dirk V ( 1052–1091), Bertha ( 1055–1094), who became queen of France, and Floris (born  1055), who became a canon at Liége. 

Floris was involved in a war of a few Lotharingian vassals against the imperial authority. On a retreat from Zaltbommel he was ambushed and killed in battle at Hamerth on 28 June 1061. His son Dirk V succeeded him. In 1063 Gertrude married Robert I of Flanders, who ruled Frisia as regent and acted as guardian for her children with Floris.

References

1061 deaths
Gerulfingian dynasty
Counts of Holland
People from Vlaardingen
1010s births
Burials at Egmond Abbey